Interstate business routes are roads connecting a central or commercial district of a city or town with an Interstate bypass. These roads typically follow along local streets often along a former U.S. Route or state highway that had been replaced by an Interstate. Interstate business route reassurance markers are signed as either loops or spurs using a green shield shaped sign and numbered like the shield of the parent Interstate highway.

Along Interstate 25 (I-25), business routes are found in all three states through which I-25 passes: New Mexico, Colorado, and Wyoming. Some states regard Interstate business routes as fully integrated within their state highway system while other states consider them to be either local roads to be maintained by county or municipal authorities or a hybrid of state and local control. Every state along I-25 regards its business routes as fully incorporated members of their respective state maintained highway systems.

Although the public may differentiate between different business routes by the number of the parent route and the location of the route, there is no uniform naming convention. Each state highway department internally uses its own designations to identify segments within its jurisdiction.

New Mexico 
All of the business loops within New Mexico are maintained by the New Mexico Department of Transportation (NMDOT). In New Mexico, Interstate business routes are named independently of their parent Interstate's designation with business loops of I-25 numbered between 10–19, those of I-10 between 20–29, and those of I-40 between 30–39. New Mexico business loop numbers ascend eastward and northward with gaps in numbering to allow for future designations. I-25 begins with a business route through Williamsburg and Truth or Consequences before proceeding northward with additional routes serving the towns of Socorro, Belen, Las Vegas, Springer, and Raton. These routes largely conform to the current or former alignment of the unsigned U.S. Route 85 (US 85) through these communities before the construction of I-25. NMDOT has decommissioned US 85 throughout the state and no longer signs the highway along its length, as US 85 entirely follows I-25 with the single exception of the business loop in Las Vegas. The American Association of State Highway and Transportation Officials (AASHTO), however, continues to recognize the New Mexico portion of US 85 maintaining continuity with sections in adjacent states.

Williamsburg–Truth or Consequences 

Business Loop 11 (BL 11) is a  business loop serving the cities of Williamsburg and Truth or Consequences in Sierra County. The loop begins at exit 75 of I-25 in Williamsburg, intersecting State Road 187 (NM 187), traveling northeast on Broadway Street through Truth or Consequences until meeting Main Avenue. Between that point and Date Street, the route follows two oneway roads with Broadway carrying northbound traffic and Main conveying traffic to the south. The routes combine and turn north on Date, intersecting the western terminus of NM 51. Turning northwest, the highway intersects NM 181 and terminates at exit 79 on I-25 on the northside of Truth or Consequences.

Most of the loop, with the exception of its I-25 interchanges, was previously part of US 85, which joined the route from the south at NM 187 and departed to the north along NM 181.

Major intersections

Socorro 

Business Loop 12 (BL 12) is a  business loop serving the city of Socorro in Socorro County. The loop begins at exit 147 of I-25 and travels northwest along California Avenue until an intersection with the northern terminus of NM 1. The loop turns north as a divided highway as it enters the city. US 60 intersects from the west, and the loop becomes concurrent with US 60 as the pair of highways continue to the north. The loop terminates at exit 150 on I-25, and US 60 continues along the Interstate as it exits Socorro.

Major intersections

Belen 

Business Loop 13 (BL 13) is a  business loop serving the city of Belen in Valencia County. The loop begins at exit 190 on I-25 and intersects the northern terminus of NM 116 as the highway travels north along Main Street into the city. The western terminus of NM 309 is met in central Belen. The loop continues north to NM 314 then turns northwest before terminating at exit 195 on I-25.

Major intersections

Santa Fe 

Business Loop 14 (BL 14) was a  business loop that served Santa Fe in Santa Fe County. The loop began at exit 278 on I-25 and traveled northeast along NM 14 (Cerrillos Road). It then went east on NM 466 (Saint Michaels Drive), cutting through the southside of Santa Fe. The road ended up as Old Pecos Trail and remained so until reaching I-25 again and terminating at exit 284. The route was decommissioned.

Major intersections

Las Vegas 

Business Loop 15 (BL 15) is a  business loop serving Las Vegas in San Miguel County. The loop continues north, passing to the west of the Las Vegas Intermodal Facility served by the Southwest Chief line of Amtrak, just south of the intersection with NM 104. Continuing north, the highway passes east of Municipal Park before terminating at NM 250 and I-25 at exit 347.

Major intersections

Springer 

Business Loop 16 (BL 16) is an unsigned  business loop serving the city of Springer in Colfax County. The loop begins at exit 412 of I-25 and travels northeast along Railroad Avenue. The loop serves as the main north–south road in the town and intersects Fourth Street, which, to the west of the loop is NM 21 and, to the east is US 56 and US 412. Continuing northwest, the loop intersects NM 468 and then runs closely parallel to the Interstate before merging at exit 414.

Major intersections

Raton 

Business Loop 17 (BL 17) is a  business loop that begins at exit 450 on I-25 south of Raton in Colfax County concurrent with US 64. The two highways intersect NM 555 then pass east of La Mesa Park, traveling along Second Street north into the city. Clayton Road takes US 64 off of the loop to the east as the loop continues north, crossing over the rail line that serves the Raton Amtrak Station before turning northwest and terminating at exit 454 on I-25.

Major intersections

Colorado 
All Interstate business routes in Colorado are maintained by the Colorado Department of Transportation (CDOT). Within Colorado, all highways maintained by the state are classified as state highways, including Interstates and U.S. Highways which hold the same numerical designations as their nationally established routes. The numerical values of all state highway names are followed by an alphabetic suffix, although this convention is used by the department internally and not reflected in route signage. Hence, the mainline of I-25 throughout the length of the state is classified as State Highway 25A while its two business routes in Aguilar and Walsenburg are internally named State Highway 25B and State Highway 25C, respectively. US 85 and US 87 are hidden routes not recognized nor signed by CDOT in southern Colorado. They are, however, established AASHTO routes maintaining continuity with signed portions in other states along their routes. In southern Colorado, the routes primarily follow I-25, including at Aguilar, but with deviations, such as along the Walsenburg business route. In addition to these, US 160 joins I-25 at Walsenburg and follows concurrently with the Interstate to Trinidad, including the portion bypassing Aguilar. Thus, in Walsenburg, US 160 crosses the business route in the town center and again at the business route's southern terminus.

Trinidad 

State Highway 25A (SH 25A) was a business route of I-25 that connected Trinidad in Las Animas County to the Interstate. The  route began as Animas Street, coming from University Street at a diamond interchange at exit 13 on I-25. The route was concurrent with US 160 along Main Street. The route turned southwest on Main Street and terminated at I-25. In 2009, a reconstruction project involved a replacement of the northbound viaduct crossing the Purgatoire River and more reconstruction in 2011, adding a new diamond interchange at Main Street and I-25 and replacing the antiquated ramps at Animas Street and University Street, which ultimately eliminated the route.

Major intersections

Aguilar 

State Highway 25B (SH 25B) is a business spur of I-25 connecting the town of Aguilar in Las Animas County to the Interstate. The  route begins at the corner of Main Street and Fir Street in Aguilar. The spur proceeds for one block north along North Fir Street before turning to the northwest along Lynn Road away from town. The route turns east along County Road 60 immediately before terminating at I-25 exit 34.

Major intersections

Walsenburg 

State Highway 25C (SH 25C) is a business loop of I-25 serving the town of Walsenburg in Huerfano County. The  route begins at I-25 exit 49 and proceeds to the west along the southern edge of Walsenburg. The route then turns to the northwest along Walsen Avenue. At Seventh Street, US 160 intersects from the west US 160 runs concurrently with the loop until US 160 turns off to the east along Fifth Street to I-25. The loop then continues northeast along Walsen Avenue, leaving town, and intersects SH 69 before terminating at I-25 exit 52.

CDOT does not recognize or sign US 85 in the southernmost part of its route within the state, nor does it recognize US 87 anywhere within Colorado, as they are redundant with other routes in the state highway system. The highways remain established by AASHTO primarily along I-25 in southern Colorado and along Walsenburg's I-25 business route.

Major intersections

Colorado Springs 

State Highway 25 Business (SH 25 Bus.) was a business loop of I-25 that served downtown Colorado Springs and Northeast Colorado Springs. The route started at exit 140 on I-25 and ran along with Nevada Avenue. This route was also part of the CanAm Highway. It was a four-lane divided street that took a straight shot through downtown going north. The route terminated at exit 148 at I-25. In 2007, actions were taken to decommission the route, along with SH 38 and portions of SH 83, in an effort to add the alignment of SH 21 (Powers Boulevard).

Major intersections

Castle Rock 

State Highway 25 Business (SH 25 Bus.) was a business loop that served the westside of Castle Rock. The route began at exit 181 as Plum Creek Pkwy and headed northwest. It then turned northeast on County Road 46 (Wolfensburger Road), heading back to the Interstate, and then terminated at exit 182 as Wilcox Street. The route was decommissioned in 1996 and was likely unsigned.

Major intersections

Wyoming 
All business routes of I-25 within Wyoming are maintained by the Wyoming Department of Transportation (WyDOT). Wyoming has no naming convention for disambiguation between different business routes with all designated simply as I-25 Business (I-25 Bus.) along the Interstate. I-25 has seven business routes within the state. Road concurrences are frequent in Wyoming, and the seven business highways often overlay multiple other highways, including U.S. Highway 87 Business (US 87 Bus.), wholly or partly at most of these seven locations, as US 87 largely follows I-25 throughout the state.

Cheyenne 

Interstate 25 Business (I-25 Bus.) and U.S. Highway 87 Business (US 87 Bus.) are business loops serving the city of Cheyenne in Laramie County. The  multiplexed highway begins at exit 7 of I-25/US 87 and is routed along Wyoming Highway 212 (WYO 212) and named College Drive. Here, I-25 Bus. leaves WYO 212, turns north onto US 85, and remains paired with it until its end. I-25 Bus./US 85/US 87 Bus. enter Cheyenne from the south and intersect I-80 at exit 362. At this point, I-180 begins. Despite the Interstate designation, the I-180 portion is not a freeway. I-25 Bus. continues north with US 85 and US 87 Bus. now as a oneway couplet through central Cheyenne northbound as Warren Avenue and southbound as Central Avenue. Near the Cheyenne Regional Airport, the oneway streets combine and continue as Central Avenue before intersecting the southern terminus of WYO 219 at Yellowstone Road. I-25 Bus. and US 87 Bus. terminate at exit 12 of I-25/US 87. Here, US 85 joins those routes northbound.

Major intersections

Chugwater 

Interstate 25 Business (I-25 Bus.) is a business route signed as Wyoming Highway 321 (WYO 321) and serving the town of Chugwater in southeastern Platte County, Wyoming. The highway begins at exit 54 of I-25/US 87. At this interchange lies the northern terminus of WYO 211. Here, I-25 Bus. travels east past the Chugwater rest area. At  is the western terminus of WYO 313. Less than  later, I-25 Bus. (WYO 321) reaches I-25/US 87 at exit 57, where they both end. WYO 321 is signed from the freeway as I-25 Bus. and serves as a de facto business route; however, I-25 Bus. is not signed anywhere along WYO 321.

Wheatland 

Interstate 25 Business (I-25 Bus.) and U.S. Highway 87 Business (US 87 Bus.) are concurrent business loops serving the town of Wheatland in central Platte County, Wyoming. I-25 Bus./US 87 Bus. begin at exit 78 of I-25/US 87. WYO 310 and WYO 312 are then intersected as the business routes turn east along South Street. The business routes turn north  later onto 9th Street and intersect WYO 316 (Gilchrist Street) shortly after. Further north, the southern terminus of WYO 320 is intersected as the business loops become South Swanson Road. At , I-25 Bus./US 87 Bus. meet I-25/US 87 at exit 80 where they end.

Major intersections

Douglas 

Interstate 25 Business (I-25 Bus.), U.S. Highway  20 Business (US 20 Bus.), U.S. Highway 26 Business (US 26 Bus.), and U.S. Highway 87 Business (US 87 Bus.) are concurrent  business loops serving the town of Douglas in southern Converse County. I-25 Bus./US 20 Bus./US 26 Bus./US 87 Bus. begin at exit 135 of I-25/US 20/US 26/US 87 southeast of Douglas. The loops follow East Richards Street into Douglas. At South 4th Street, the loops turn north through Douglas. The loops turn west onto Center Street  later, which becomes Yellowstone Highway. Near their end, the northern terminus of WYO 94 and the southern terminus of WYO 59 are intersected at Riverbend Drive. Past that intersection, the business routes rejoin I-25/US 20/US 26/US 87 at exit 140.

Major intersections

Glenrock 

Interstate 25 Business (I-25 Bus.) is a business route serving the town of Glenrock in Converse County, Wyoming. I-25 Bus. begins at exit 165 of I-25. The business route travels north, concurrent with WYO 95, into Glenrock on Deer Creek Road and then South 4th Street. Here, I-25 Bus. turns east onto Birch Street to travel with US 20/US 26/US 87 for the remainder of its route, while WYO 95 turns west onto Birch Street. I-25 Bus. continues east out of Glenrock, intersecting the northern terminus of WYO 90 (Boxelder Road), before reaching its eastern end at exit 160 of I-25. US 20/US 26/US 87 join eastbound I-25.

Major intersections

Casper 

Interstate 25 Business (I-25 Bus.) is a business loop serving the city of Casper in eastern Natrona County. The  loop begins at exit 188A of I-25, heading south on Center Street along with US 20 Bus. and unsigned WYO 255. The loop turns left onto 1st Street, where it joins US 20 Bus. and US 26 Bus. WYO 251 intersects the loop from the south along Wolcott and Durbin streets before US 20/US 26/US 87 depart on Yellowstone Highway and their respective business routes end. There, I-25 Bus. turns north along Bryan Stock Trail, where eastbound US 20/US 26 and southbound US 87 are concurrent with I-25 Bus. westbound. The loop ends at exit 186 of I-25.

Major intersections

Buffalo 

Interstate 25 Business (I-25 Bus.) is a business spur serving the city of Buffalo in Johnson County that runs concurrently with US 87 Bus. The  spur begins at exit 298 of I-25/US 87 south of Buffalo. I-25 Bus. intersects WYO 196  into its route as it follows Main Street into Buffalo. US 16 joins the spur at Fort Street  later. US 16 has a short  concurrency with the spur until Hart Street, where it turns east along I-90 Bus. where I-25 Bus. terminates. I-90 Bus. approaches the intersection from the north along the northern extension of US 87 Bus.

Major intersections

See also

References

External links 
Interstate 25 in Wyoming, AARoads
Interstate Highways, Wyoming Routes, Corco Highways

25
Interstate 25
Transportation in Huerfano County, Colorado
Transportation in Las Animas County, Colorado
Transportation in Colfax County, New Mexico
Transportation in San Miguel County, New Mexico
Transportation in Sierra County, New Mexico
Transportation in Socorro County, New Mexico
Transportation in Valencia County, New Mexico
Transportation in Converse County, Wyoming
Transportation in Johnson County, Wyoming
Transportation in Laramie County, Wyoming
Transportation in Natrona County, Wyoming